Post Sportverein Wien  is a multi-sports club from the city of Vienna in Austria, and today operates in addition to football another 23 sections, including handball, field hockey, tennis, basketball, volleyball, futsal, table tennis, bowling, bridge, weightlifting, gymnastics, squash, skiing, Motorsport, judo and chess.

Basketball
The formerly operated basketball section won in 1950 for the only time in their history the Austrian basketball championship.

Football
The association was founded on 26 September 1919 under the name of Post- Telegraphen- und Fernsprechangestellten Österreichs (sports club of Austrian postal telegraph and telephone employees).  The club colors are black and white and played in the first year in Vienna protecting group. On March 22, 1924 came the merger with the W.F.C. Fürth and a change in the club name in Sport Klub Post Wien, Sports Association of postal and telegraph employees with the club colors blue and orange. The SK Post rose 1924 in the fourth class of the General Football Association (today WFV) and reached in the first year the league title and the associated rise in the third grade Vienna. Also in this class which went straight to the championship. After separation from the Football Association played the SK Post Wien in 2nd class East and rose after the league title in 1927/28 on the 1st Amateur class.

Hockey
The already existing in the 1930s and finally in 1939 established department maintains each two women's and men's teams, a senior and a parent hockey team, and seven youth teams.

 Austrian Champion Men box: 2006, 1982, 1968, 1967, 1965, 1964, 1963, 1962, 1960, 1959, 1958, 1957, 1956, 1955, 1954, 1953, 1951
 Austrian Champion Men Hall: 1974, 1966, 1965, 1964, 1963, 1962, 1961, 1959, 1958, 1951
 Austrian Champion Ladies box: 1980, 1960
 Austrian Champion Ladies Hall: 1982, 1981, 1979, 1977, 1976

Judo
The Judo Section was founded in January 1948.

List of the national champions of Post SV Wien:

Table tennis
The highly successful table tennis section decreed especially before the Second World War a number of top Austrian players like Erwin Kaspar, Heinrich Bednar and Gertrude Pritzi. The club itself awards include 1939 German Table Tennis Team Championships both women as well as men.

References

Association football clubs established in 1919
Basketball teams in Austria
Austrian field hockey clubs
Football clubs in Vienna
Sport in Vienna